Blanca Gil Sorli (born 19 September 1983) is a Spanish female former water polo player. She was part of the Spain women's national water polo team. She competed at the 2011 World Aquatics Championships.

Clubs 

 Club Natació Ciutat 
 CN Sabadell
 ASD Roma
 Orizzonte Catania
 Olympiacos
 Blu Team Catania
 Orizzonte Catania
 Club Esportu Mediterrani

References

External links
 Blanca Gil at enciclopedia.cat
 Ficha de la RFEN 2008 (in Spanish)

1983 births
Living people
Spanish female water polo players
Olympiacos Women's Water Polo Team players
Place of birth missing (living people)
21st-century Spanish women